Toni is a given name.

Toni may also refer to:
Luca Toni (born 1977), Italian footballer
Simon de Tosny, also spelled Toni, 12th-century English Cistercian monk and prelate
924 Toni, an asteroid
Tōni Station, a railway station in Kamaishi, Iwate Prefecture, Japan
Toni (1928 film), a British film by Arthur Maude
Toni (1935 film), a film by Jean Renoir
Toni (album), a 1956 studio album by Toni Harper

See also

De Toni (disambiguation), an Italian surname
Tonči